Timmowal is a village located near Jandiala Guru in the Amritsar District of Punjab, about 30 km from Jodhe and 4 km from Tangra.

About
This village has a religious place named Baba Gurdita Ji of the Sikh religion. Many people come here to worship. A fair (Mela) is held every year in the month of March which is attended by many people. Kabaddi tournaments are also held. Hockey player Harmanpreet Singh was born in this village.

Villages in Amritsar district